Cladaster is a genus of echinoderms belonging to the family Goniasteridae.

The genus has almost cosmopolitan distribution.

Species:

Cladaster analogus 
Cladaster carrioni 
Cladaster katafractarius 
Cladaster macrobrachius 
Cladaster rudis 
Cladaster validus

References

Goniasteridae
Asteroidea genera